The Chevy Chase Neighborhood Library is a branch of the District of Columbia Public Library in the Chevy Chase neighborhood of Washington, D.C. It is located at 5625 Connecticut Avenue NW.  The neighborhood's first public library opened in 1920 and relocated several times before its current building opened in 1968.

References

External links 

 Official website

Public libraries in Washington, D.C.